Carl Jorgensen is a former association football player who represented New Zealand at international level.

Jorgensen made a solitary official international appearance for New Zealand as a substitute in a 1–2 loss to Australia on 15 May 1991.

He played most of his career with Waitakere City in New Zealand, save for a single season with Brisbane United. He walked out on the Queensland club following criticism about his aggressive playing style from United coach Miron Bleiberg.

References 

Living people
New Zealand association footballers
New Zealand international footballers
1972 births
Association football defenders
Brisbane Strikers FC players